The Last Child is a suspense thriller by American novelist John Hart. It was first published in 2009 by Minotaur Books.

Awards and distinctions
2010 Edgar Award winner for Best Novel
2010 Anthony Award nominee for Best Novel 
2010 Barry Award winner for Best Novel
2009 Crime Writers' Association Ian Fleming Steel Dagger Award winner for best thriller published in the UK
New York Times best seller
Kirkus Reviews starred review

References

2009 American novels
American thriller novels
Edgar Award-winning works
Minotaur Books books